

Managers

References

FC Lehenda-ShVSM Chernihiv templates